Miller is an unincorporated community and census-designated place in Hancock County, Iowa, United States. As of the 2010 census, the population was 60.

Demographics

History
Miller was platted in 1895. The population of the community was just 10 in 1902, but had increased to 165 by 1925.

Education
Miller is a part of the Garner–Hayfield–Ventura Community School District. It was previously in the Garner–Hayfield Community School District, which merged into the current GHV district on July 1, 2015.

References

Census-designated places in Iowa
Census-designated places in Hancock County, Iowa